The West Dummerston Covered Bridge is a historic covered bridge spanning the West River in Dummerston, Vermont, between Vermont Route 30 and Camp Arden Road.  Built in 1872, it is at  the longest covered bridge entirely within the state of Vermont.  It was listed on the National Register of Historic Places in 1973.

Description and history
The West Dummerston Covered Bridge is located in west-central Dummerston, a short way north of the village of West Dummerston. It spans the West River in a roughly east–west direction, and is mounted on stone abutments and a central stone pier. The sides of the bridge are finished in flush vertical boards, and the ends are sheathed in wooden clapboards. The roof is of corrugated metal, laid over an older wooden shingle roof. The side walls have diamond-shaped openings cut in them to admit additional light.

The bridge was built in 1872 by master builder Caleb Lamson, and is the only known surviving example of his work in Windham County.

See also
List of Vermont covered bridges
National Register of Historic Places listings in Windham County, Vermont
List of bridges on the National Register of Historic Places in Vermont

References

External links
 

Covered bridges on the National Register of Historic Places in Vermont
Bridges completed in 1872
Wooden bridges in Vermont
Covered bridges in Windham County, Vermont
National Register of Historic Places in Windham County, Vermont
Road bridges on the National Register of Historic Places in Vermont
Lattice truss bridges in the United States
1872 establishments in Vermont
Buildings and structures in Dummerston, Vermont